Duponchelia is a genus of moths of the family Crambidae.

Species
Duponchelia caidalis Oberthür, 1888
Duponchelia fovealis Zeller, 1847
Duponchelia lanceolalis (Guenée, 1854)
Duponchelia naitoi Sasaki, 2008
Duponchelia ranalis (Hampson, 1907)

References

Spilomelinae
Crambidae genera
Taxa named by Philipp Christoph Zeller